Jebu Donga is a 1987 Indian Telugu-language film directed by A. Kodandarami Reddy. The film stars Chiranjeevi, Bhanupriya and Radha in important roles. It was later dubbed in Hindi as Aaj Ka Gang Leader. It was produced by M. Arjuna Raju and M. Ramalinga Raju under the Roja Movies banner.

Plot
Chittibabu and Bhanupriya are small-time thieves who are fighting with each other. Sathyanarayana and Gollapudi are CBI officers who are investigating Kannada Prabhakar (KP) and his activities in his secret forest hideout with the help of a secret agent. When the agent gets killed, they suspect infiltrators in their agency and make Chiru as the decoy agent so that their actual agent can get the info. The villains, thinking that Chiru is a CBI agent try to kill him and create problems for him, which he doesn't understand and he becomes involved in a murder case to be rescued by a beautiful girl (Radha). He later learns of the confusion on him from the officers and refuses to help them. But when he learns that Radha is the actual agent and is the daughter of Satyanarayana trying to bring criminals to justice, he feels responsible for the country and joins hands with them in eliminating the threat posed by KP's organization.

Cast
 Chiranjeevi as Chitti Babu / Chakrapani
 Bhanupriya
 Radha
 Shanmukha Srinivas
 Raghuvaran
 Kannada Prabhakar
 Babu Antony
 Kota Srinivasa Rao
 Kaikala Satyanarayana
 Gollapudi Maruthi Rao
 Kuyili (actress)

Soundtrack

External links

1987 films
Films directed by A. Kodandarami Reddy
Films scored by K. Chakravarthy
1980s Telugu-language films